The Asia/Oceania Zone was one of three zones of regional competition in the 2014 Fed Cup.

Group I 
 Venue: National Tennis Centre, Astana, Kazakhstan (indoor hard)
 Dates: 5–8 February

The seven teams were divided into one pool of three and one pool of four teams. The two pool winners took part in play-offs to determine the nation advancing to the World Group II play-offs. The nations finishing last in their pools took part in relegation play-offs, with the losing nation being relegated to Group II for 2015.

Pools

Play-offs 

  was promoted to World Group II play-offs
  was relegated to Asia/Oceania Zone Group II

Group II 
 Venue: National Tennis Centre, Astana, Kazakhstan (indoor hard)
 Dates: 4–8 February
The thirteen teams were divided into one pool of four and three pools of three teams. The winners of each pool played off against each other to determine which one team advanced to Asia/Oceania Zone Group I in 2014. All the other nations competed in the same manner for the positional play-offs.

Pools

Play-offs

1st to 4th playoffs

5th to 13th playoff

Final placements 

  advanced to Asia/Oceania Zone Group I.

References 

 Fed Cup Result, 2014 Asia/Oceania Group I
 Fed Cup Result, 2014 Asia/Oceania Group II

External links 
 Fed Cup website

 
Sport in Astana
Tennis tournaments in Kazakhstan